Myron van Brederode (born 6 July 2003) is a Dutch professional footballer who plays as a winger for AZ Alkmaar.

Club career
Van Brederode is a youth product of Overbos and AFC, before moving to the youth academy of AZ in 2016. He signed a contract with AZ in 2020, and began his senior career with Jong AZ shortly after. He signed a professional contract on 7 April 2022, and began training with the senior team. He made his professional debut with AZ in a 3–1 Eredivisie win over RKC Waalwijk on 15 May 2022, coming on as a late substitute in the 80th minute.

International career
Van Brederode is a youth international for the Netherlands, having represented the Netherlands U16s, U16s, and U19.

References

External links
 
 Ons Oranje U17
 Ons Oranje U19 Profile

2003 births
Living people
People from Haarlemmermeer
Dutch sportspeople of Surinamese descent
Dutch footballers
Association football wingers
Netherlands youth international footballers
Eredivisie players
Eerste Divisie players
Jong AZ players
AZ Alkmaar players